Events from the year 1853 in France.

Incumbents
 Monarch – Napoleon III

Events
30 June - Georges-Eugène Haussmann is selected as préfect of the Seine (department) to begin the re-planning of Paris.
6 December - Taiping Rebellion: French minister de Bourboulon arrives at the Heavenly Capital aboard the Cassini.
14 December - Compagnie Générale des Eaux established by imperial decree.
Arthur de Gobineau begins publication of his An Essay on the Inequality of the Human Races (Essai sur l'inégalité des races humaines).

Births
20 January - Marguerite de Witt-Schlumberger, feminist campaigner (died 1924).
23 April - Jules Auguste Lemire, priest and social reformer (died 1928).
27 April - Jules Lemaître, critic and dramatist (died 1914).
21 May - Jacques Marie Eugène Godefroy Cavaignac, politician (died 1905).
14 July - Henri Menier, businessman and adventurer (died 1913).
24 July - Henri-Alexandre Deslandres, astronomer (died 1948).
14 August – Dominique-Marie Gauchet, admiral (died 1931)
9 September - Pierre Marie, neurologist (died 1940).
30 October - Louise Abbéma, painter and designer (died 1927).
17 December - Pierre Paul Émile Roux, physician, bacteriologist and immunologist (died 1933).
26 December - René Bazin, novelist (died 1932).

Deaths
8 January - Claude-Laurent Bourgeois de Jessaint, aristocrat and civic administrator (born 1764).
20 February - Jean-François Bayard, playwright (born 1796).
3 April - Louis Gustave le Doulcet, comte de Pontécoulant, politician (born 1764).
11 April - Louis-Emmanuel Jadin, composer, pianist and harpsichordist (born 1768).
23 April - Auguste Laurent, chemist (born 1807).
27 May - Jean Marie Pardessus, lawyer (born 1772).
May - Henri-Bernard Dabadie, baritone (born 1797).
3 September - Augustin Saint-Hilaire, botanist and traveller (born 1799).
10 October - Pierre François Léonard Fontaine, architect, interior decorator and designer (born 1762).

References

1850s in France